Solenzo  is a department or commune of Banwa Province in western Burkina Faso. Its capital is the town of Solenzo. According to the 2019 census the department has a total population of 157,596.

Towns and villages
The largest towns and villages and populations in the department are as follows:
 Solenzo	(14 387 inhabitants) (capital)
 Bama	(1 080 inhabitants)
 Ban (8 776 inhabitants)
 Bayé (5 478 inhabitants)
 Bèna (11 963 inhabitants)
 Bialé (1 892 inhabitants)
 Bonza	 (5 209 inhabitants)
 Daboura (7 285 inhabitants)
 Darsalam (3 114 inhabitants)
 Dèssè (1 756 inhabitants)
 Dinkiéna (4 593 inhabitants)
 Denkoro (2 490 inhabitants)
 Dira (3 209 inhabitants)
 Dissankuy (2 794 inhabitants)
 Gnassoumadougou (3 329 inhabitants)
 Kiè (6 212 inhabitants)
 Koakoa (881 inhabitants)
 Koma, Burkina Faso (1 941 inhabitants)
 Hèrèdougou (3 205 inhabitants)
 Lanfiéra (617 inhabitants)
 Lèkoro (1 668 inhabitants)
 Masso (2 465 inhabitants)
 Mawé (2 329 inhabitants)
 Montionkuy (786 inhabitants)
 Moussakongo (3 310 inhabitants)
 Pouy (1 059 inhabitants)
 Sanakuy (2 327 inhabitants)
 Siguinonghin (3 683 inhabitants)
 Toukoro (5 277 inhabitants)
 Yèrèssoro (2 812 inhabitants)

References

Departments of Burkina Faso
Banwa Province